The Rashtriya Mill Mazdoor Sangh is a trade union for textile mills in Mumbai, India.

Trade unions in India
Trade unions in Maharashtra
Textile industry in Maharashtra
Textile and clothing trade unions
Organizations with year of establishment missing